John (I) La Touche or Latouche ( – 3 February 1810) was a member of the Irish House of Commons for Newcastle (1783–90),  Newtownards (1790–96),  Harristown (1797), and  Kildare County (1797–1800). After the Acts of Union 1800 he continued as UK MP for Kildare County in the first UK Parliament, standing down at the 1802 general election in which his sons John (II) and Robert were elected; both had been Irish MPs alongside their father.

John I was the first of the La Touche family to live in the Harristown estate, bought by his father David from the 1st Duke of Leinster.

References

1730s births
Year of birth uncertain
1810 deaths
Irish MPs 1783–1790
Irish MPs 1790–1797
Irish MPs 1798–1800
Members of the Parliament of the United Kingdom for County Kildare constituencies (1801–1922)
UK MPs 1801–1802
Whig (British political party) MPs for Irish constituencies
Members of the Parliament of Ireland (pre-1801) for County Down constituencies
Members of the Parliament of Ireland (pre-1801) for County Kildare constituencies